County Route 547 (CR 547) is a county highway in the U.S. state of New Jersey. The highway extends  from Route 70 in Lakehurst to the intersection of Broadway and Myrtle Avenue in Long Branch. Near its southern terminus, it passes the East Gate of Joint Base McGuire–Dix–Lakehurst, known as Lakehurst Naval Air Station in the past, and the site of the crash of the Hindenburg in 1937.

Route description

Ocean County

CR 547 begins at an intersection with Route 70 in Lakehurst, Ocean County, heading northeast on two-lane undivided Lakehurst-Lakewood Road. Immediately after beginning, the route crosses the Manasquan Brook into Manchester Township and turns north, running through forested areas of the Pine Barrens to the east of the Lakehurst Maxfield Field naval station. CR 547 is briefly a four-lane divided highway as it passes an entrance to the naval station before narrowing back to a two-lane undivided road and entering more dense forests as it comes to the CR 571 junction. From this point, the route becomes Lakehurst-Whitesville Road before continuing into Jackson Township as South Hope Chapel Road, running northeast through more woods with occasional development, crossing an abandoned railroad right-of-way before turning north and intersecting CR 527 near homes and businesses. Past this intersection, CR 547 continues north through wooded areas of residences before coming to an intersection with CR 528 near businesses.

At this point, CR 547 turns east to form a concurrency with CR 528 on East Veterans Highway, with CR 639 continuing north on South Hope Chapel Road. The two routes continues through residential and commercial development, intersecting CR 626 before crossing into Lakewood Township. At this point, CR 528/CR 547 becomes Lakewood-New Egypt Road and turns northeast into wooded residential neighborhoods. In this area, the routes turn east onto Central Avenue and passes more homes before crossing Lake Carasaljo and coming to an intersection with US 9. At this point, CR 528 continues northeast on Hurley Avenue and CR 547 turns north to follow US 9 on Madison Avenue, crossing the Metedeconk River, which Lake Carasaljo is formed from. After intersecting the western terminus of Route 88, Madison Avenue continues north through the commercial and residential center of Lakewood as a four-lane undivided road, with CR 547 splitting from US 9 by turning east onto two-lane 8th Street. The route passes through residential areas before splitting from 8th Street by turning northeast onto Squankum Road. Signage along US 9 shows CR 547 leaving the concurrency at 9th Street. Along this stretch, CR 547 runs through wooded areas of homes, crossing CR 526.

Monmouth County

Crossing the Metedeconk River again, CR 547 enters Howell Township in Monmouth County and continues through a mix of homes, businesses, and woods as it crosses the Southern Secondary railroad line operated by the Delaware and Raritan River Railroad. Farther northeast, the road continues into a mix of farmland, woodland, and residences as it reaches an intersection with CR 549 and CR 21. After this, CR 547 turns north and the lanes split as it comes to a cloverleaf interchange with I-195. The lanes rejoin as the route comes to an intersection with CR 524 and CR 524A, at which point CR 524 turns north to join CR 547. The two routes continues north through wooded areas of homes and businesses on Lakewood-Farmingdale Road, intersecting CR 18 before entering Farmingdale and turning northwest. The road becomes Main Street and passes residences before crossing the Southern Secondary into business areas. CR 547 splits from CR 524 by heading northeast on Asbury Avenue, passing some homes before crossing back into Howell Township. The route passes a mix of woodland and residential neighborhoods before making a turn to the east and crossing the Southern Secondary again. CR 547 enters Wall Township and runs through wooded areas of industry before intersecting Route 33 and Route 34 at the Collingwood Circle.

CR 547 heads east for a brief concurrency with four-lane Route 33 after the circle before turning northeast onto four-lane undivided Shafto Road. The road continues into Tinton Falls and passes through a mix of farms and woods before continuing into forested areas with some commercial development. Upon crossing CR 16, the road runs between Naval Weapons Station Earle to the west and wooded residential and commercial development to the east. CR 547 passes through dense forests before intersecting CR 38 and passing under the Garden State Parkway. The road intersects CR 38 again after and enters Eatontown at the CR 51 junction, where the name becomes Wyckoff Road. A short distance later, the route comes to a partial interchange providing access to and from the southbound direction of the Route 18 freeway before heading into wooded residential neighborhoods. CR 547 widens to a divided highway as it passes the Monmouth Mall and comes to an intersection with Route 36. The road passes more businesses as it becomes undivided and comes to the Route 35 junction a short distance later. CR 547 continues past more homes before it reaches an intersection with Route 71.

CR 547 forms a concurrency along Route 71 (Broad Street) heading east before the road (whose name changes to Eatontown Boulevard) becomes the border between Oceanport to the north and Eatontown to the south at Main Street. CR 547 splits from Route 71 at Monmouth Road by continuing east along Eatontown Boulevard past more homes. The road turns southeast and enters West Long Branch, becoming Broadway and crossing Route 36 in commercial areas. CR 547 continues past a mix of homes and businesses, intersecting CR 15 (Locust Avenue) and CR 11 (Oceanport Avenue) before continuing into Long Branch and reaching its eastern terminus at Myrtle Avenue. Past the eastern terminus, Broadway continues through Long Branch toward the Atlantic Ocean.

History
 
Prior to 2017, CR 547 ended at Route 71 and CR 537 (Broad Street) in Eatontown. On February 23, 2017, the Monmouth County Board of Chosen Freeholders extended CR 547 along Route 71 and the former routing of CR 537 to Long Branch due to CR 537's realignment through Fort Monmouth. However , signage for CR 537 still appears along the recently extended section of CR 547 from Route 71 to Long Branch.

Major intersections

CR 547 Spur

County Route 547 Spur (CR 547 Spur) is a  county-maintained section of Wyckoff Road in Wall Township, Monmouth County. The four-lane road runs between Route 34 and Route 33 and CR 547 and is flanked by retail and office buildings on both sides for most of its length. Only two numbered signs appear along the road: A "To CR 547" near its southern end and a sign blade on a traffic signal noting the road as just "CR 547," consistent with the Monmouth County Road Plan which calls this a part of CR 547.

See also

References

External links

547
547
547